Fabian Senninger (born 25 January 1996) is a German-Nigerian professional footballer who plays as a full-back.

Personal life
Senninger is the son of a German mother and Nigerian father. In December 2016 Senninger stated that he was ready to commit to Nigeria internationally over Germany.

References

External links
 

1996 births
Living people
Footballers from Berlin
German footballers
Nigerian footballers
German sportspeople of Nigerian descent
Association football fullbacks
Hannover 96 II players
SV Meppen players
SV Lippstadt 08 players
Berliner AK 07 players
Regionalliga players
3. Liga players
Nike Academy players
SC Staaken players